The 1992–93 Vancouver Canucks season was the Canucks' 23rd NHL season.

Summary
On September 21, Jim Robson, who had called Canucks play-by-play action since their WHL days, was given the Foster Hewitt Memorial Award for excellence in hockey broadcasting and inducted into the Hockey Hall of Fame.  The Canucks were looking to build on the successes of the previous season, but they would have to do so without their top line centre.  Instead of re-signing with the Canucks and having Sovintersport (the governing sports body in the former Soviet Union) continue to draw a portion of his salary, Igor Larionov decided to play the year in Lugano, Switzerland, and then return to the NHL the following season. With the loss of Larionov, more production would be hoped for from Petr Nedved, who was entering his third NHL season.

Keeping the rest of their cast in order, for the most part, the Canucks won their first four games, outscoring the opposition 24–9.  They slumped back to .500 in early November but then exploded, going 20–5–2 in 27 games.  During that time, Nedved racked up a club-record point-scoring streak.  He recorded 24 points in 15 games before being held pointless in a 5–2 win over Montreal on December 27.  On January 19, a first-place showdown took place at Pacific Coliseum, as the Canucks (with 61 points), had a chance to overtake Pittsburgh as the league's top team. However, the Canucks lost 5–2 and would never again get a chance to jump into first overall.  The game also ended the club's amazing 18-game home unbeaten streak (16–0–2).  Pavel Bure was scoring goals at an unprecedented pace for a Canuck and was voted to start in the 1993 NHL All-Star Game with 246,447 fan votes.  On March 1, in a neutral-site game in Hamilton against Buffalo, Bure became the first Canuck to score 50 goals in a season.  Grant Fuhr was the goaltender and RW Dixon Ward and Robert Dirk drew the assists on the goal in a 5–2 win for the Canucks.  Exactly a month later, Bure scored on Tampa Bay's Pat Jablonski to become the first Canuck to record 100 points in a season.  He would then record his 60th goal into an empty-net in a 6–3 win over Calgary on April 11, a game in which the Canucks clinched the division title for the second straight year. It was Bure's last goal of the season to go with 50 assists for 110 points—15th in the league.  The day after Bure recorded his 100th point, long-time owner Frank Griffiths was elected to the Hockey Hall of Fame in the Builder's Category.  Griffiths had owned the Canucks for 19 years now, although his son Arthur Griffiths had gradually taken over the day-to-day running of the team over the past decade.  A couple of other noteworthy accomplishments took place that spring.  Ryan Walter played in his 1,000th NHL game on March 20 in a 7–2 home loss to the New York Islanders, and Kirk McLean recorded his 127th victory as a Canuck on April 7, passing Richard Brodeur as the Canucks all-time wins leader, in a 5–4 overtime victory over Edmonton.  The Canucks beat Los Angeles 8–6 on April 15, the final game of the season, to record their 46th victory and 100th and 101st points of the season.  It was the first time the team eclipsed the century-mark in points.  It was also the first time that there were six 70-point scorers on the team.  Bure, Cliff Ronning (85), Geoff Courtnall (77), C Murray Craven (77), Trevor Linden (72), and Nedved (71) all reached that mark. As well, Gino Odjick broke his own team penalty-minutes record (370). The Canucks finished 4th in the league in goals with 346, had four 30-goal scorers, and led the league in most even-strength goals scored, with 249.

Once again the Canucks matched up with Winnipeg in the opening round.  The Canucks rolled to victories in Games One and Two by 4–2 and 3–2 scores before being beaten almost single-handedly by Winnipeg's star rookie, Teemu Selanne.  Selanne, who shattered the rookie goal-scoring record during the season with 76, scored three times in helping the Jets to a 5–4 win.  Two nights later, the Canucks put a strangle hold on the series, winning 3–1 to take a series lead of the same score.  It appeared that the Canucks were poised to eliminate the Jets in five, thereby avoiding the long, grinding seven-game series of a year ago which made them ill-prepared for the division finals.  The Jets scrapped their way to a 3–3 tie through 60 minutes, though, and won in overtime when Selanne's centering pass hit LW Tim Hunter in the shin and re-directed past McLean.  Back in Winnipeg on April 29, the rabid fans were determined to send the series to a decisive seventh game, and the teams battled to another 3–3 deadlock with 3.4 seconds to play and a faceoff deep in Winnipeg's end.  The Canucks won the draw and Sergio Momesso managed a shot on goal, which sneaked through Bob Essensa and into the net as time expired.  The Canucks jumped off the bench, thinking they had won the game and the series, but a lengthy video review was unable to determine if the puck had crossed the line before time expired and it was ruled no goal.  Eight minutes into overtime Greg Adams drove hard to the Winnipeg net and was brought down by a Winnipeg backchecker.  As he went down, the puck hit his skate and went into the net.  Another replay was ordered, but this time a goal was awarded and the Canucks had won the series.  There was little on-ice celebrating, though, as the incensed Winnipeg fans began littering the ice with debris, and so the teams quickly shook hands and vacated the playing surface.

The Division Final began on the afternoon of May 2 with the Canucks beating Los Angeles 5–2 to take the series lead.  The Kings looked lethargic in the game, but came out gunning three nights later, as the dreaded combination of Wayne Gretzky and Jari Kurri accounted for five goals in the Kings 6–3 victory.  In Game Three, the big scorers were at it again, as the Kings ran up a 7–4 win to take the series lead.  The Canucks' big guns were not to be outdone, though, as they came back with an offensive onslaught have their own to win 7–2 in Game Four.  Game Five was dominated by the Canucks, but Kelly Hrudey had his best outing of the series, keeping his Kings in a 3–3 tie through regulation time.  Hrudey continued his theatrics in the fourth period, making several fine saves which included robbing Pavel Bure of what looked like a sure goal.  But the Kings started to turn the tide in period number five and at the 6:31 mark Gary Shuchuk took a weak shot from a bad angle that found its way under Kirk McLean's arm to give the Kings the winning tally.  The Canucks were now on the brink of elimination and played Game Six very cautiously.  After trailing 1-0 after one period, Gerald Diduck and Jim Sandlak gave the Canucks the lead early in the second period, but Dana Murzyn picked a bad time to take two penalties on one play, one for high-sticking, the other for cross-checking.  The Canucks managed to kill off the first penalty, but botched a line change as the second penalty began and were caught with too many men on the ice. The Kings scored three times, twice on the power plays, to take a 4-2 lead into the intermission.  A Wayne Gretzky goal midway through the third period padded their lead, with Trevor Linden getting it back a few minutes later.  With the score now 5–3, the Canucks pulled McLean to attempt the comeback, but there was no further scoring.  For the second year in a row, the Canucks had been ousted in the second round after winning the division title.  After over a decade of very modest post-season success, the fans of Vancouver were now hungry for something more.

Regular season

Schedule and results

October

Monthly record: 5–4–1 (home 3–2–0; road 2–2–1)

November

Monthly record: 9–5–1 (home 6–0–1; road 3–5–0)

December

Monthly record: 9–1–1 (home 7–0–1; road 2–1–0)

January

Monthly record: 6–4–5 (home 3–1–2; road 3–3–3)

February

Monthly record: 6–5–0 (home 3–3–0; road 3–2–0)

March

Monthly record: 5–8–1 (home 2–5–0; road 3–3–1)

April

Monthly record: 6–2–0 (home 3–0–0; road 3–2–0) 

Green background indicates win.
Red background indicates loss.
White background indicates tie.

Playoffs

Smythe Division Semi-finals: vs. (4) Winnipeg Jets
Vancouver wins series 4–2.

Smythe Division Final: vs. (3) Los Angeles Kings
Los Angeles wins series 4–2.

Player statistics

Scoring leaders

Note: GP = Games played; G = Goals; A = Assists; Pts = Points; +/- = Plus/minus; PIM = Penalty minutes

Goaltending
Note: GP = Games played; TOI = Time on ice (minutes); W = Wins; L = Losses; OT = Overtime losses; GA = Goals against; SO = Shutouts; Sv% = Save percentage; GAA = Goals against average

Playoffs

Scoring Leaders

Note: GP = Games played; G = Goals; A = Assists; Pts = Points; +/- = Plus/minus; PIM = Penalty minutes

Goaltending

Note: GP = Games played; TOI = Time on ice (minutes); W = Wins; L = Losses; GA = Goals against; SO = Shutouts; Sv% = Save percentage; GAA = Goals against average

Awards and records

1993 Canuck awards winners
Molson Cup - Pavel Bure
President's Trophy - Pavel Bure
Ram Tough Award - Trevor Linden, Jim Sandlak
Cyclone Taylor Trophy - Pavel Bure
Cyrus H. McLean Trophy - Pavel Bure
Babe Pratt Trophy - Dana Murzyn
Fred J. Hume Award - Cliff Ronning
Most Exciting Player Award - Pavel Bure

Pavel Bure
 Recorded first regular season hat-trick and first 4-goal game vs. Winnipeg on October 12, 1992.
 Molson Cup Player of the Month for November and December.
 Had 13 game point streak (12–10–22), longest of career and fourth longest in franchise history from January 3–30.
 Was voted in by the fans to represent the starting lineup of the Campbell Conference, at the 44th NHL All-Star Game in Montreal on February 6, 1993.  Bure would score two goals in the game.
 Fastest Canuck to score 30 goals, doing it in 35 games, and 40 goals, doing it in 44 games.
 Scored his 50th goal on Grant Fuhr vs. Buffalo at Hamilton's Copps Coliseum on March 1, 1993. Becoming the first 50-goal scorer in club history.
 Scored on Pat Jablonski at Tampa Bay on April 1, 1993. Becoming the first Canuck to record 100 points in a season.
 Scored his 60th goal into an empty-net vs. Calgary on April 11, 1993.
 Finished 13th among NHL scorers and first among Canucks with 60–50–110.
 Finished 5th in NHL scoring with 60 goals.
 Finished 1st in NHL with 407 shots.
 Tied for 1st with 7 shorthanded goals, which is also a club record.
 Tied for 5th in plus-minus (+35).
 Holds and shares 15 regular season club records.

Trevor Linden
 Third straight season without missing a game (244 consecutive games).
 Moved into 8th on the Canucks all-time scoring list.
 Recorded his 300th career NHL and Canuck point vs. Tampa Bay on February 3, 1993.
 Molson Cup Player of The Month for February.

Cliff Ronning
 Molson Cup Player of the Month for October and March.
 Recorded his 100th career NHL goal vs. Winnipeg on February 20, 1993.
 Recorded a six-game point streak March 22-April 3, scoring 4–5–9.
 Scored a career high 3–3–6 vs. Los Angeles on April 15, 1993.

Dixon Ward
 Recorded first career NHL and Canuck point vs. Edmonton on October 6, 1992.
 Scored his first career NHL and Canuck goal vs. Winnipeg on October 12, 1992.
 Had his best game as a pro vs. Calgary on November 4, 1992, recording 2–2–4 and named first star of the game.
 Had two, four game point streaks.

Kirk McLean
 Established a franchise record with 12 career Canuck shutouts vs. Los Angeles on December 31, 1992, breaking Gary Smith's mark of 11 career Canuck shutouts.
 Played in his 300th career NHL game at Hartford on March 6, 1993.
 Recorded his 127th career victory to pass Richard Brodeur as the Canucks all-time wins leader vs. Edmonton on April 7, 1993.

Petr Nedved
 Runner-up for NHL Player of the Week during the first week of December.
 Recorded a franchise record 15 game point-scoring streak from November 19-December 27, scoring 15–9–24, breaking Darcy Rota's club record of 14 set in the 1982–83 season.
 Played in his 200th career NHL and Canuck game at Winnipeg on February 26, 1993.

Gino Odjick
 Sets franchise records with 47 penalty minutes in a game and in a period vs. Los Angeles on November 12, 1992.
 Had his best game as a pro scoring 2–1–3 and was a +3 vs. Chicago on November 23, 1992.

Greg Adams
 Had a seven-game point streak, scoring 6 goals, 3 assists for a total of 9 points from November 23-December 13.
 Recorded his 300th point as a Canuck vs. Montreal on December 27, 1992.

Geoff Courtnall
 Had an eight-game point streak, scoring 3 goals, 13 assists for a total of 16 points from November 21-December 9.
 Recorded his 500th career NHL point vs. Chicago on January 27, 1993.

Sergio Momesso
 Played in his 400th career NHL game vs. Winnipeg on October 12, 1992.
 Scored his 100th career NHL goal vs. Washington on October 28, 1992.

Dana Murzyn
 Recorded his 100th career NHL assist vs. Winnipeg on October 12, 1992.
 Played in his 500th career NHL game vs. Los Angeles on December 31, 1992.

Gerald Diduck
 Recorded 100th career NHL assist vs. Buffalo on January 15, 1993.
 Played his 500th career NHL game at Chicago on January 24, 1993.

Pat Quinn
 Sets club record with 46 wins in a single-season.
 Sets club record with 101 points in a single-season.

Others
 Adrien Plavsic played in his 100th career NHL game vs. Chicago on November 23, 1992.
 Robert Dirk played in his 200th career NHL game at Montreal on November 28, 1992.
 Jiri Slegr scored his first career NHL goal vs. Montreal on December 27, 1992.
 Dave Babych recorded his 600th career NHL point at Quebec on February 9, 1993.
 Tim Hunter played in his 600th career NHL game at Hamilton on March 1, 1993, vs. Buffalo.
 Kay Whitmore played in his 100th career NHL game at Saskatoon on March 11, 1993, vs. Minnesota.
 Jyrki Lumme played in his 300th career NHL game vs. Winnipeg on March 12, 1993.
 Ryan Walter played in his 1,000th career NHL game vs. NY Islanders on March 20, 1993.
 Murray Craven played in his 700th career NHL game at St. Louis on March 30, 1993.

Transactions

Trades

Free agents acquired

Free agents lost

Received from waivers

Placed on waivers

Expansion draft
Vancouver's losses at the 1992 NHL Expansion Draft in Montreal, Quebec.

Draft picks
Vancouver's picks at the 1992 NHL Entry Draft in Montreal, Quebec.

Farm teams

Hamilton Canucks
Vancouver Canucks AHL affiliate that play in Hamilton, Ontario, and their home arena is the Copps Coliseum.

Columbus Chill
Vancouver Canucks ECHL affiliate that play in Columbus, Ohio, and their home arena is the Ohio Expo Center Coliseum.

External links
Official website of the Vancouver Canucks

See also
1992–93 NHL season

References

 1993/94 Vancouver Canucks Yearbook

Vancouver Canucks seasons
Vancouver C
Vancouver
Smythe Division champion seasons